Billbergia decora is a species of flowering plant in the genus Billbergia. This species is native to Peru, Bolivia and Brazil.

Cultivars 
 Billbergia 'Bruantii'
 |Billbergia 'Leopoldii'
 Billbergia 'Showboat'
 Billbergia 'Sunset'
 Billbergia 'Theodore L. Mead'
 Billbergia 'Windii'
 × Billmea 'Casper'

References 

decora
Flora of Bolivia
Plants described in 1864
Garden plants